The Iowa Utilities Board (IUB) is a 3-member public utilities commission, with beginnings in 1878. It is a quasi-judicial tribunal, which regulates services and rates of electric, natural gas, water and telecommunication providers, as well as all pipelines and transmission lines in the U.S. state of Iowa and has existed with its present name since 1986.

Brief history (1878–1986)
The history of the IUB begins in 1878 as the Iowa Board of Railroad Commissioners, whose three members were publicly elected for a two-year term. In 1911, an Office of Commerce Counsel was established within, which with increasing electrification took on the regulation of transmission lines. It was renamed the Iowa State Commerce Commission in 1937.

It was only in 1963 that the regulation of rates and services of all public utility companies (electricity, natural gas, water and telecommunications) became Commission tasks. At the same time, the legislature extended commissioner terms to six years and the positions became appointed.
In 1986, the state renamed the Commission as Iowa Utilities Board.

Authority
The Iowa Utilities Board regulates rates and services of electric utilities, natural gas utility and water utilities, and a some telecommunication companies per Iowa Code chapters 476 through 479B It supervises all pipelines and transmission lines, and the sale and distribution of electricity. 
In addition it has various connected authorities like resolving disputes and dealing with complaints, enforcing safety as far as engineering standards go.

Electric utilities
The IUB regulates service and rates of the 2 Iowa electric companies, MidAmerican Energy and Interstate Power and Light Company (IPL), a subsidiary of Alliant Energy Company and also the Rural Electric Cooperatives (RECs). The latter can choose to be regulated for rates and only the Linn County, Iowa REC has chosen to do so.

Communications utilities
The IUB regulates only the service of landline telephone providers in Iowa, and neither regulates cellphone providers nor any rates. Since 2007 it issue cable television franchise agreements.

Waterworks
The IUB regulates rates and service of only the Iowa-American Water Company, which operates in Davenport, Iowa and Clinton, Iowa. It neither regulate small, nor municipally owned water utilities.

Members
Members are appointed by the Governor of Iowa for 6-year terms.  the IUB consisted of Libby Jacobs, Nick Wagner with Geri Huser as chairwoman.  
 the IUB consisted of Richard W. Lozier, Joshua Byrnes with Geri Huser as chairwoman. 

Huser has been described as "businessfriendly". In 2017, there was a petition to remive 

Board members since the board's inception in 1986 are listed in the table per its website.

Court cases
 Verizon Communications Inc. v. Federal Communications Commission (2002)
 Sprint Communications, Inc. v. Jacobs, began in 2011
 Mt. Pleasant Municipal Utilities v. Iowa Utilities Board, 2014
Hawkeye land company v. Iowa Utilities Board, 2014
 Great Lakes Communication Corporation v. IUB, began in 2015

References

External links
 Iowa Utilities Board Website

Iowa
State agencies of Iowa